Confessions of the Fox is a novel by American writer and academic Jordy Rosenberg, first published in 2018. It re-imagines the lives of Jack Sheppard, eighteenth-century English thief and jail-breaker, and his lover Edgeworth Bess.

Jordy Rosenberg 
Jordy Rosenberg released his debut novel, Confessions of the Fox, in June of 2018. Since then, he has gotten much recognition and won many awards for his writing. Jordy Rosenberg is a professor at the University of Massachusetts-Amherst in the Department of English and Associated MFA Faculty in the Program for Poets and Writers.The criticism of academia present in Confessions of the Fox poses an interesting question if this is a hint into his own experience in the field. Rosenberg is most famous for his novel, Confessions of the Fox, which is an 18th-century historical fiction novel.

Plot 
The novel is structured as a story within a story. A 21st-century academic, Dr Voth, discovers a manuscript that claims to be the confessions of Jack Sheppard. The manuscript reveals that Sheppard (like Voth) is a transgender man, and describes his experience of transitioning gender. It also reveals that Bess is of South Asian (Lascar) descent and that she grew up in the Fens. The manuscript documents Sheppard's love affair with Bess, their criminal escapades, their memories of childhood, and their run-ins with authority. Voth's annotations to the manuscript begin as scholarly comments on its likely authenticity but soon become more personal, comically documenting his recent break-up and his difficulties at work. The novel offers satirical commentary on historical and contemporary political issues, including over-policing and surveillance, racism, the dredging of the Fens, and managerialism in 21st-century universities.

In fictionalizing Sheppard's story, the novel continues a tradition established by Daniel Defoe, John Gay (The Beggar's Opera), Bertolt Brecht and Kurt Weill (The Threepenny Opera).

Main Characters

Jack Shepphard
In the novel, Jack Shepphard is a trans man who previously was an apprentice to a carpenter turned to theft and prison break artist. His work with a carpenter gave him the skills to be able to break out of jail four separate times, making him the most wanted criminal in London. His illegal work as a thief parallels with forbidden queerness in 18th century London. He has a relationship with prostitute, Edgeworth Bess, who finally enables him to identify himself as a man instead of his biological sex. During the novel, she was the one who performed top surgery on him, allowing his physical body to match his identity. Eventually, another infamous London criminal, Jonathon Wild, turned Shepphard in and he was eventually executed in 1724 at the age of 22.  

Rosenberg’s fictional Jack Shepphard is based on the historical folk hero who lived in London in the 18th century, but it is important to note that this is not a true account. It is unclear if he was transgender in real life, but Rosenberg notes that in many works he is represented in a way that is now seen as gender Queer, and it was his small and flexible frame that helped him escape confinement so many times.

Edgeworth Bess
Elizabeth Khan, also known as Edgeworth Bess, was Jack's main love interest in the novel. Bess was a prostitute in London who had a severe disregard for authority and the law. She has an interesting background in that she identified as "lascar" who was brought to London as part of England's East India Company. In the book, she is described to be of Southeast Asian descent. She was a free spirit, made clear through her willingness to accept Jack in a society that would not. 

The historical figure of Bess was actually named Bess Lyon, and Rosenberg's account of her is fictional.

Jonathan Wild
As Jack emerged into the world of thievery, he learned about the famous Jonathan Wild. Jonathan ran a business of thievery in London, though he disguised himself as a constable. After hearing about Jack Sheppard, he tried to recruit him to join his gang. Bess urged Jack to work to be a "freelance roguer" instead of joining into Wild's organized heists that revolved around bribery. When Sheppard refused Wild's offer, he was furious. Wild eventually was a major player in Jack's final arrest and his eventual sentencing to death.

Dr. Voth
Dr. Voth is the fictional character who discovered and is editing the manuscript. His footnotes give the reader a better understanding of who he is and why he is so fascinated by this manuscript. He is a professor at a university but is put on unpaid leave, giving him unlimited time to focus on this manuscript. It is clear he has many qualms with the university that he works at, and also discusses his personal life, specifically his struggles of dating as a queer man. Dr. Voth and the author, Jordy Rosenberg, have many parallels so it is important to consider that the author may have based this character off of himself. Dr. Voth's character adds a playful and comedic spin to the novel, which contrasts with the more grim aspects of the manuscript.

Themes

Identity 
As a queer man himself, it makes sense that Rosenberg crafted the novel around the important theme of identity. The character of Jack is a trans man, and it is unclear if he has female genitalia or is a hermaphrodite. The lack of focus on his genitalia insinuates the fact that his biological gender does not matter, as he eventually defines himself as a man. Furthermore, Rosenberg claims in an interview that this combined with the numerous terms to discuss genitalia all were to somewhat mock the cis-het conventions around the rigid relationship between desire and certain body parts. Rosenberg says that he was intending for the experience of genital resignification to help structure his novel. 

In the beginning of the book, the carpenter he apprentices calls him “girl”, but when Bess refers to him as a “handsome boy”, he is relieved to realize that he can identify himself however he wishes. Bess is a major player in him being able to come into his own skin, and is the first woman he feels confident enough to have an intimate relationship with. Though being transgender was not necessarily acceptable in 18th century London, Bess accepted Jack which allowed him to accept himself as well. Despite an entire police force after him and the looming prospect of the death penalty, Jack's greatest fear was that his biological identity will be discovered and he will be forced to revert to living like how he did before he represented himself as a man.

This theme also relates to Dr. Voth, the editor of the manuscript, because he is a trans man as well. In the footnotes, he discusses the struggles of dating in the 21st century while transgender.

Criticism of Academia 
One of the reasons Dr. Voth is so infatuated with the manuscript is because he reveals he has been put on unpaid leave by the Dean of Surveillance for "improperly utilized leisure"-- playing phone Scrabble during office hours. There are many references throughout the book at his disappointment in the way he is treated as a professor at a university, and appreciates the opportunity to be able to immerse himself in the manuscript, which is something he was extremely interested in. However, he later is angered when a company called P-Quad Publishers and Pharmaceuticals coerces the manuscript from him. The University claims Voth is legally obligated to turn the manuscript over, which furthers his resentment to the institution and capitalism in general. 

It is interesting to consider the possibility that as an academic himself, was Rosenberg touching on his own frustrations with his experiences working at a university? In an interview, he discusses the holistic life of study. He explains that from his time working in academia, he has come to the belief that university's goal is to make its staff feel so insignificant, they will stop struggling for a space there. This is reminiscent of Dr. Voth's experience with the publishing company as they try to take the manuscript from him, and the university tells him he is obligated to do so. Rosenberg says that a lot of times, "there are things about the university that grinds people down so badly that they should certainly not feel compelled to continue to struggle there".

Liberation
It is no mistake that Jack breaking social norms with his queerness parallels with his breaking of the law and defiance of London's new prison system. In the beginning of the novel, he is an apprentice to an abusive carpenter who literally chains him to his bed at night. At this time, Jack was still forced to identify with his biological sex, which was torturous for him. Ironically, using his expertise on locks from working with the apprentice was what allows him to break out of the chains at night. This was when he met Bess and identifies himself as a man, so he is not only physically liberated from the chains but also freeing himself from the constraints of society. Furthermore, Bess is a major reason why he is able to become liberated from the fear of his queerness being discovered; she instills confidence that he would not have been able to derive from himself.

Liberation is a theme that can be discovered in almost all aspects of the novel. Even in Dr. Voth's defiance of the university's wishes for him to surrender the manuscript, he is seen to free himself from the expectations the university has for him.

Genre and Title
This book can be classified under many different genres. Primarily, it is a historical fiction novel that takes place in 18th century London. It is also a novel of transgender literature, as well as can be considered a thriller, queer love story, and anti-capitalist narrative. Despite the novel's historical setting, it is impressive that Rosenberg is able to capture the human struggle through an accessible narrative, helping the audience resonate with the characters.

In the novel, Dr. Voth points out that "fox" is an 18th century term for "man", hence the title, "Confessions of the Fox". It is also worth noting that the animal of a fox is stereotypically sneaky and mysterious, possibly hinting at a double meaning for Jack as a thief and jail-breaker. The "Confessions" part of the title is reasonable because this is the supposed manuscript of Jack Sheppard's life as he recorded it.

18th Century Queer Perspective
When asked Rosenberg's reasoning for reimagining Shepphard as a trans man living in 18th century London, he explains he wanted to combat the "cookie-cutter trans narratives" in mainstream culture in which transness is kept separate from other social forces; he hoped to connect things that mainstream media would like to keep in separate boxes. He notes that though it is not clear if Jack thought of himself as trans or not, he was continually described to be what can now be identified as genderqueer. Despite Jack's identification of himself, Rosenberg points out those identifications themself are anachronistic ways of thinking of sex and gender during this period.

Bess refers to Jack's transness as "somethingness", and this abstract description was intentional. Before Bess, Jack viewed his "somethingness" with severe shame and confusion, but she helps him become comfortable with himself. Rosenberg admits that his refusal to describe Jack's genitalia partly came from a "fear about mainstream readers' speculating gaze". This decision also touches on Rosenberg's belief that one's identity is so much more than their physical body. On the other hand, Dr. Voth is very explicit in his descriptions of his body. Rosenberg explains that in 18th century, he has found that writing about the body was literal and non-metaphorical. Therefore, it is as if Dr. Voth talks about his body in more of an 18th century way while Shepphard writes in more of a modern tone in this sense. This blurring of the lines in describing the body between present and history was an intentional decision.

Critical reception 
The novel was named a "book of the year" by the New Yorker, Huffington Post and Kirkus Reviews. It was a finalist for the Lambda Literary Award and was shortlisted for the Center for Fiction First Novel Prize.

References

2018 American novels
Novels with transgender themes
American fiction
Novels about British prostitution
Novels set in London
Novels set in the 18th century
Metafictional novels
Campus novels
American LGBT novels